This is a list of compositions by Luise Adolpha Le Beau.

Piano

Piano solo 
 3 pieces, Op. 1
 Konzert-Etüde, Op. 2
 Theme & Variations for piano, Op. 3
 Piano Sonata in A Minor, Op. 8
 8 Preludes, Op. 12
 6 Fugues, Op. 21
 Improvisata, Op. 30
 Romance in Des Major, Op. 31
 Gavotte in F Minor, Op. 32
 Ballade in B Minor, Op. 47
 Sarabande, Op. 48/1
 Gavotte, Op. 48/2
 Gigue, Op. 48/3
 Deutscher Reignen, Op. 49
 Trauermarsch in D Minor, Op. 53
 3 pieces, Op. 57
 Barcarole, Op. 59
 Im Walde, Op. 63
 Abendklänge, Op. 64

Chamber music

Violin and piano 
 Violin Sonata in C Minor, Op. 10
 Mazurka for Violin and Piano, Op. 13/1
 Gavotte for Violin and Piano, Op. 13/2
 Romance for Violin and Piano, Op. 13/3
 Schlummerlied for Violin and Piano, Op. 13/4
 Präludium for Violin and Piano, Op. 13/5
 Romance in G Major, Op. 35
 Elegie in G Minor for Violin and Piano, Op. 44
 Violin Sonata in E Minor, Op. 46
 Du bist das Morgenroth for Violin and Piano, Op. 58/1
 Der erste Kuss for Violin and Piano, Op. 58/2
 Gondellied for Violin and Piano, Op. 58/3

Cello and piano 
 Cello Sonata in D Major, Op. 17
 Romance for Cello and Piano, Op. 24/1
 Gavotte for Cello and Piano, Op. 24/2
 Wiegenlied for Cello and Piano, Op. 24/3
 Mazurka for Cello and Piano, Op. 24/4
 Five pieces for Cello and Piano, Op. 65a

Viola and piano 
 Nachtstück for Viola and Piano, Op. 26/1
 Träumerei for Viola and Piano, Op. 26/2
 Polonaise for Viola and Piano, Op. 26/3

Piano trio 
 Piano Trio in D Minor, Op. 15

Piano quartet 
 Piano Quartet in F Minor, Op. 28

String quartet 
 String Quartet, Op. 34

String quintet 
 String Quintet, Op. 54

Other 
 Canon for 2 violins and Piano, Op. 38

Orchestral

Symphonies 
 Symphony in F Major, Op. 41

Symphonic poems 
 Hohenbaden, Op. 43

Piano and orchestra 
 Fantasie for piano and Orchestra, Op. 25
 Piano Concerto, Op. 37

Other 
 Overture in F Major, Op. 23

Opera 
 Hadumoth, Op. 40
 Der verzauberte Kalif, Op. 55

Choral music 
 Der schlummerlosen Sonne, Op. 9/1
 Beweint sie, Op. 9/2
 Müde bin ich, Op. 9/3
 Neuer Frühling, Op. 9/4
 Ein geistlicher Abend, Op. 9/5
 Nordmännerlied, Op. 19/1
 Rheinsage, Op. 19/2
 Ständchen, Op. 19/3
 Grabgesang, Op. 19/4
 Ruth, Op. 27
 Thumerlied, Op. 36/1
 Lied, Op. 36/2
 Der Wind, der wandernde Wind, Op. 60/1
 Schneeglöckchen, Op. 60/2
 Vater unser, Op. 61
 Der 100. Psalm, Op. 62
 Sanctus, Op. 65
 Miriams Lied

Lieder 
 Künftiger Frühling, Op. 4/1
 Der träumende See, Op. 4/2
 Meeres Abend, Op. 4/3
 Veilchen, unter Gras versteckt, Op. 4/4
 Der stille Grund, Op. 4/5
 Frühlingsanfang, Op. 6/1
 Abendlied, Op. 6/2
 Gruß an die Nacht, Op. 7/1
 Ein Gebet, Op. 7/2
 Juche, Op. 7/3
 Die Alpenrose, Op. 7/4
 Wiegenlied, Op. 7/5
 Kornblumen und Heidekraut, Op. 11/1
 Ohn' Ade, Op. 11/2
 Abendfrieden, Op. 11/3
 Der Spielmann, Op. 11/4
 Im Arno, Op. 11/5
 Gottes Segen, Op. 14/1
 Trost, Op. 14/2
 Abendlied, Op. 14/3
 Der kühne Schiffer, Op. 16/1
 Die Vätergruft, Op. 16/2
 Abendlied, Op. 18/1
 Unterm Christbaum, Op. 18/2
 Trutznachtigall, Op. 18/3
 Herbstklage, Op. 18/4
 Frühlingsnacht, Op. 18/5
 Im Sängersaal, Op. 22
 In den Ufern des Ayr, Op. 29/1
 O kehre bald zurück, Op. 29/2
 Liebestraum, Op. 33/1
 Spielmannslied, Op. 33/2
 Frisch gesungen, Op. 33/3
 Wiegenlied, Op. 39/1
 Erinnerung, Op. 39/2
 Der Rose Bitte, Op. 39/3
 Das Weib des Räubers, Op. 42/1
 Die Insulanerin, Op. 42/2
 Wie dir, so mir, Op. 45/1
 In der Mondnacht, Op. 45/2
 Ich habe die Blumen so gern, Op. 45/3
 Die Spinnerin, Op. 50/1
 Fischerlied, Op. 50/2
 Im Winter, Op. 50/3
 Acht Kinderlieder, Op. 52
 Unsterblichkeit: Hymnus, Op. 56/1
 Unsterblichkeit; Hymnus, Op. 56/2

External links 
 List of compositions (in German)

Le Beau, Luise Adolpha